Marrit Fledderus (born 15 May 2001) is a Dutch long-track speed skater.

As a junior, Fledderus became national champion in the 500 metres in 2020. She represented her nation at the 2021 World Junior Speed Skating Championships. She became junior world champion in the team sprint and won the bronze medal in the 1000 metres event. Fledderus won also several 2019–20 ISU Junior World Cup Speed Skating races in the 500 metres, 1000 metres and team sprint.

As a senior Fledderus won the bronze medal at the 2021 Dutch Single Distance Championships in the 500 metres event.

Records

Personal records

Tournament overview

source:

References 

2001 births
Place of birth missing (living people)
Dutch female speed skaters
Living people
21st-century Dutch women